Penka-Michel is a commune in the West Region of Cameroon. It is found in the Menoua district, or department, in the West region of Cameroon. Penka-Michel is considered a part of Bansoa, a town between Bafoussam and Dschang. It is often referred to as 'Bansoa ville', or downtown Bansoa.

Penka-Michel is host to many Bamileke languages and dialects.

See also
Communes of Cameroon

References
 Site de la primature - Élections municipales 2002 
 Contrôle de gestion et performance des services publics communaux des villes camerounaises - Thèse de Donation Avele, Université Montesquieu Bordeaux IV 
 Charles Nanga, La réforme de l’administration territoriale au Cameroun à la lumière de la loi constitutionnelle n° 96/06 du 18 janvier 1996, Mémoire ENA. 

Populated places in West Region (Cameroon)
Communes of Cameroon